The canton of La Vallée de l'Agly is an administrative division of the Pyrénées-Orientales department, in southern France. It was created at the French canton reorganisation which came into effect in March 2015. Its seat is in Rivesaltes.

It consists of the following communes: 
 
Ansignan
Arboussols
Bélesta
Campoussy
Caramany
Camps-sur-l'Agly
Cases-de-Pène
Cassagnes
Caudiès-de-Fenouillèdes
Espira-de-l'Agly
Estagel
Feilluns
Fenouillet
Fosse
Lansac
Latour-de-France
Lesquerde
Maury
Montner
Opoul-Périllos
Pézilla-de-Conflent
Planèzes
Prats-de-Sournia
Prugnanes
Rabouillet
Rasiguères
Rivesaltes
Saint-Arnac
Saint-Martin-de-Fenouillet
Saint-Paul-de-Fenouillet
Salses-le-Château
Sournia
Tarerach
Tautavel
Trévillach
Trilla
Vingrau
Vira
Le Vivier

References

Cantons of Pyrénées-Orientales